Bromuniola is a genus of Central African plants in the grass family. The only known species is Bromuniola gossweileri, native to Zaïre, Tanzania, Angola, and Zambia.

See also
 List of Poaceae genera

References

Panicoideae
Monotypic Poaceae genera
Flora of Africa